Clarke Preparatory School is a private PK-12 school in Grove Hill, Alabama.

History
Grove Hill Academy was founded in 1970 by the Clarke School Foundation Inc. as a segregation academy. The school attracted the attention of the United States Commission on Civil Rights, prompting an inspection tour in 1982, along with eight other schools in Alabama The school's sponsor, the Clarke School Foundation Inc. was granted tax exempt status in September 1995. The building burned on April 7, 1996.  The school rebuilt at its current location and renamed Clarke Preparatory School.

References 

Private K-12 schools in Alabama
Educational institutions established in 1970
Segregation academies in Alabama
1970 establishments in Alabama